Masafi Al-Wasat, also known as Al-Masafi, is a football team from Baghdad, Iraq. As of the 2014–15 season, they play in the Iraqi League.

Ammar Gaiym played for them in 2009-10.

Honours
Iraq Division One
Winners (1): 2008–09 (shared)

References

External links
Masafi Al-Wasat page at Goalzz.com

Football clubs in Iraq
Football clubs in Baghdad